Reema Khan born Sameena Khan, known mononymously as Reema, is a Pakistani television host and former stage dancer, Lollywood film actress, director and producer. Khan was one of the leading film actresses in Pakistan during 1990s. She has appeared in more than 200 films since making her debut in 1990 and has been recognised by Pakistan and Indian film critics for her acting.
She received the Pride of Performance Award in 2019 for her contributions to Pakistani cinema.

Early life and career
Reema was born as Sameena Khan in Lahore on 27 October 1971. In 1985, she appeared as a child actress in film Qismat. She was first spotted in 1990 by the Pakistani film director Javed Fazil, who offered her the leading role in his film Bulandi.

Personal life
Reema Khan married Pakistani-American cardiologist S. Tariq Shahab in November 2011. On 24 March 2015, Khan gave birth to her son, Azlan.

Filmography

As an actress 

 Bulandi   (1990)
 Zameen Aasman (1994)
 Jo Darr Gya Woh Marr Gya (1995)
 Munda Bigra Jae (1995)
 Love 95 (1995)
 Umar Mukhtar (1997)
 Nikah (1998)
 Mujhe Chand Chahiye (2000)
 Pehchaan (2000)
 Fire (2002)
 Shararat (2003)
 Koi Tujh Sa Kahaan  (2005)
 One Two Ka One (2006)
 Love Mein Ghum  (2011)

As director and producer

Television series

Awards and recognition

See also 
 List of Lollywood actors

References

External links
 
 
 

1971 births
Living people
Pakistani film actresses
Pakistani female models
Pakistani film producers
Nigar Award winners
Actresses from Lahore
Film directors from Lahore
20th-century Pakistani actresses
21st-century Pakistani actresses
Recipients of the Pride of Performance
Actresses in Urdu cinema
Pakistani emigrants to the United States
Actresses in Punjabi cinema
Actresses in Pashto cinema
Pakistani television personalities
Pakistani television hosts
Pakistani television actresses
Pakistani film directors
Pakistani women film directors
Women television directors
Pakistani television directors
People from Lahore